The Cold Hard Facts of Life is a studio album by country music singer Porter Wagoner. It was released in 1967 by RCA Victor (catalog no. LSP-3797).

The album debuted on Billboard magazine's Top Country Albums chart on June 10, 1967, peaked at No. 4, and remained on the chart for a total of 28 weeks. The album included the No. 2 hit, "The Cold Hard Facts of Life".

AllMusic gave the album a rating of four stars. Reviewer Dan Cooper called it "good, straight-ahead country" and referred to the cover art as "the hillbilly graphics howler of all time."

Track listing

References

1967 albums
Porter Wagoner albums
RCA Victor albums